A circle is a simple geometric shape.

Circle or circles may also refer to:

Humanities
 Social circle, a group of socially interconnected people
 Circular reasoning, a kind of logical fallacy
 A meeting or series of meetings, which may (or may not) use the format of people seated in a circle
 Circle time

Transportation
Traffic circle, a type of circular intersection in which traffic must travel in one direction around a central island
Circle Line (disambiguation), a mass transit line that contains a circle
Circle Interchange, Chicago, a freeway interchange

Companies
Circle (company), a consumer finance company
Circle (healthcare partnership), a healthcare company
Circles (film distributor), a women's film organisation

Technology
 A social grouping in Google+
 Circle, a social networking service for iPhone and Android

Places
Circle, Alaska, United States
Circle, Montana, United States
Circle Interchange, Chicago
Circle Lake, a lake in Minnesota
 Circle, an alternative name for an administrative sub-district in India; see Tehsils of India
Centre for Innovation, Research and Competence in the Learning Economy, an interdisciplinary research centre in Lund, Sweden

Music

Bands
Circle (Finnish band), rock music group
Circle (American band), jazz group

Labels
Circle Records, 1940s jazz record label
Circle Records (Germany), 1970s jazz record label

Albums
Circle (Amorphis album), 2013
Circle (Boom Bip and Doseone album), 2000
Circle (C418 album), 2010
Circle (George Cables album), 1985
Circles (Marilyn Crispell album), 1991
Circle (Deen album)
Circle (Kaela Kimura album), 2006
Circle (Onew album), 2023
Circle (Onyanko Club album)
Circle (Scala & Kolacny Brothers album), 2010
Circles (Dante Bowe album)
Circles (Gavin Harrison & 05Ric album), 2009
Circles (Heroes & Zeros album)
Circles (Mac Miller album)
Circles (P.O.D. album)
Circles (Soil & "Pimp" Sessions album)
Circles (The Autumn Defense album)
Circles (The New Seekers album), 1972
Circles (Unwed Sailor EP), 2006
Circles, a 2006 album by Shooting Star

Songs
"Circles" (Andrea Koevska song)
"Circles" (Atlantic Starr song), covered by Kimara Lovelace
Circles (Berio), a 1960 composition by Luciano Berio
"Circles" (Cavo song)
"Circles" (Christina Aguilera song)
"Circles" (Deno song)
"Circles" (George Harrison song)
"Circle" (Harry Chapin song)
"Circles" (Jana Kramer song)
"Circle" (Marques Houston song)
"Circles" (Pierce the Veil song)
"Circles" (Post Malone song)
"Circles" (The Who song)
"Circles (Just My Good Time)", a song by Busface featuring Sophie Ellis-Bextor
"Circle", a song by Edie Brickell & New Bohemians their 1988 album Shooting Rubberbands at the Stars

"Circle", a song by Lacuna Coil from their 1999 album In a Reverie
"Circle", a song by Slipknot from their 2004 album Vol. 3: (The Subliminal Verses)
"Circles", a song by Baboon from their 2006 self-titled album 
"Circles", a 1977 song by Captain & Tennille from their album Come In from the Rain
"Circles", a 1987 song by Joe Satriani from his album Surfing with the Alien
"Circles", a 1998 song by Soul Coughing from their album El Oso
"Circles", a 2002 song by Nonpoint from their album Development

Film and television
Circles (2013 film), a 2013 Serbian film
Circle (2014 film), also known as Daire, a 2014 Turkish film
Circle (2015 film), a 2015 American psychological thriller film
Circle (Eddie Izzard), tour by British comedian Eddie Izzard
"Circle", a first-season episode of the 1974 TV series Land of the Lost
"Circles", an episode of the television series Teletubbies
Circle (TV series), a 2017 South Korean sci-fi mystery TV series
Circle (TV network), a country music and lifestyle digital subchannel television network

Art and literature
 Circles (essay), an essay by Ralph Waldo Emerson
 A : either a group of artists or a single artist that produces dōjin works

Other uses
Circle (country subdivision), administrative country subdivision
Kreisel, a turn found on six bobsleigh, luge, and skeleton tracks
Lufbery circle, a defensive air combat tactic

See also

Vienna Circle

The Circle (disambiguation)
Circle City (disambiguation)
Circle symbol (disambiguation)
Full Circle (disambiguation)
Golden Circle (disambiguation)
Inner circle (disambiguation)
Magic circle (disambiguation)
Vicious circle (disambiguation)
Ring (disambiguation)
O (disambiguation)